Wang Jing (born December 22, 1971) is a Chinese sprint canoeist who competed in the early 1990s. She won a bronze medal in the K-4 500 m event at the 1991 ICF Canoe Sprint World Championships in Paris.

Wang also finished fifth in the K-4 500 m event at the 1992 Summer Olympics in Barcelona.

References

Sports-reference.com profile

1971 births
Canoeists at the 1992 Summer Olympics
Chinese female canoeists
Living people
Olympic canoeists of China
ICF Canoe Sprint World Championships medalists in kayak
Sportspeople from Dandong